Photography is a 1973 Hungarian drama film directed by Pál Zolnay. The film was entered into the 8th Moscow International Film Festival where it won the Silver Prize. It was also selected as the Hungarian entry for the Best Foreign Language Film at the 46th Academy Awards, but was not accepted as a nominee.

Cast
 István Iglódi as retoucher, agent
 Ferenc Sebő as story singer
 Márk Zala as photographer

See also
 List of submissions to the 46th Academy Awards for Best Foreign Language Film
 List of Hungarian submissions for the Academy Award for Best Foreign Language Film

References

External links
 

1973 films
1970s Hungarian-language films
1973 drama films
Hungarian black-and-white films
Films directed by Pál Zolnay
Hungarian drama films